Alfred Dennis Newman (1926-1990) was a male cyclist who competed for England.

Cycling career
Newman represented England in the road race at the 1950 British Empire Games in Auckland, New Zealand.

He was the 1949 British Massed Start Champion and twice on the winning team in the National Hill-climb Championships.

Personal life
During the Games in 1950 he lived at Picton Grove, Billesley, Warwickshire, and was a clerk by trade.

References

1926 births
1990 deaths
English male cyclists
Cyclists at the 1950 British Empire Games
Commonwealth Games competitors for England